Bosko's Parlor Pranks is a November 1934 Happy Harmonies cartoon produced by Hugh Harman and Rudolph Ising for Metro-Goldwyn-Mayer starring their character Bosko. It is the first Bosko cartoon produced in color (two-strip Technicolor), and the first made at MGM following the Harman-Ising studio ending its deal to produce Looney Tunes and Merrie Melodies for Warner Bros. and Leon Schlesinger. Warner Bros. would later gain ownership of the Happy Harmonies and other MGM cartoons following its acquisition of the Turner Entertainment Co. catalog.

In this cartoon, Bosko appears with the same character design as in his Warner Bros. cartoons. After Hey-Hey Fever, Bosko's second MGM cartoon, the character was redesigned into a more clear caricature of an African-American boy. Most of the animation in the cartoon is reused from the Looney Tunes shorts in which Bosko appeared.

Plot 
The cartoon begins with Bosko plucking petals off of a flower as he walks toward his girlfriend Honey's house, accompanied by his dog, Bruno. Meanwhile, Honey is at her home, struggling to teach her cat-like son, Wilbur, how to play the piano, as he keeps insisting that he wants an ice cream cone. As a whistling Bosko walks up to Honey's doorstep and polishes his Derby hat, Bruno nosily sniffs the front porch until he is scolded by his owner, causing him to blush. Bosko then proceeds to slide-step to Honey's door and ring her doorbell.

Honey is still dealing with Wilbur when she hears the doorbell ring. She skips to the door and finds Bosko at her entrance. After he greets her, Wilbur walks up to him and asks if he has an ice cream cone, but he replies by patting him on the head. Bosko then walks to Honey's piano whilst clicking his fingers, and plays it. Honey starts dancing to his music, and they greet each other in song. After performing a dance simultaneously, Wilbur complains yet again that he wants an ice cream cone. Honey then decides to go to the store to buy Wilbur an ice cream cone, and she requests Bosko to babysit him while she is away, to which he reluctantly accepts to do. She and Bosko then bid farewell to each other.

To entertain Wilbur, Bosko sings about his love for Honey (which is repeatedly interrupted by Bruno), to the child's chagrin. After the dog leaves, Bosko picks up a book about the Knights of the Round Table, which he shows to Wilbur, attracting his attention. When Wilbur points to a picture of Sir Galahad, Bosko claims that he was a courageous knight himself, which Wilbur does not believe. Bosko then falsely claims that he was a boxer who defeated the world's boxing champion in a heated bout. However, the child still not believes these remarkable feats. Bosko then walks to the piano, takes a balloon from his pants pocket, blows it, and sets it on his nose, making him resemble Jimmy Durante. He then impersonates Durante as he plays the piano, which irritates Wilbur, to his disgust. He then sings a song about how he rescued Honey from a runaway vehicle as a cowboy, but Wilbur's constant complaints about his ice cream cone finally start getting to his nerves.

As Honey skips home carrying Wilbur's ice cream cone, Bosko tells the story about his experiences as a musketeer. When Honey finally heads into the room with Wilbur's ice cream cone, Bosko is still pretending to be a musketeer, and he accidentally knocks the cone out of Honey's hand with an umbrella, and it falls on his head. The cartoon ends with Wilbur sarcastically remarking about the incident, Bruno sprinting into the room and licking Bosko, and Honey laughing at the sight.

References

External links 
 https://www.imdb.com/title/tt0024908/

1934 animated films
1934 films
Films directed by Hugh Harman
Metro-Goldwyn-Mayer animated short films
1930s American animated films
Bosko films
Happy Harmonies
Short films directed by Friz Freleng